Prasna Marga is a unique work on Hindu astrology, natal and horary ('Prashna' means 'Horary'), that appears to be a major classical text covering every aspect of human existence. It was written in Sanskrit Sloka – format in the year 1649 A.D. in a place called Edakad near Tellasseri in the present Indian State of Kerala, by Narayanan Nambutiri of Panakkattu house (a Namboodari Brahmin) of Kerala. The author himself wrote a brief commentary to his book with the name 'Durgamartha prakasini'. This work is known in English through the commentary written by Punnasseri Nambi Neelakantha Sarma, a disciple of Kerala Varma. All Parashari principles are briefly available in this classic, and  about which principles it is claimed that one conversant with the six  branches of Jyotisa will never err in predictions.

Prasna Marga is the most comprehensive and elaborate exposition of Horary astrology. This classic occupies a high position of pride without entering into which like mines of works riches of Indian astrology cannot be discovered. In Prasna Marga each house is allotted a fixed number of Sarvashtaka bindus above which the house prospers (this concept is taken from Ashtakavarga chapter of BPHS or Brihat Parashara Hora Shastra, the foundational classic of Indian predictive astrology)). Prasna Marga also uses many techniques, like Navams-Navams, Navams-Dvadasams, etc. which are not used by anyone in practice, but were used earlier.

See also
Ashtamangala prasnam

References

Sanskrit texts
Hindu astrological texts
1649 books
17th-century Indian books